DIPEx (Database of Individual Patient Experiences) is an Oxford, England-based health charity that works closely with many researchers including the Health Experiences Research Group at University of Oxford to disseminate research into personal experiences of health and illness. The charity publishes its works through the website healthtalk.org, which features interviews of people talking about their experiences of living with a range of health conditions and are aimed at patients, their carers, family and friends, doctors, nurses and other healthcare professionals.

History 
DIPEx was established in 2001 by GP Dr Ann McPherson CBE and clinical pharmacologist Andrew Herxheimer after their own experiences of illness. Ann had been diagnosed with breast cancer and although she knew all the medical information, couldn't find anyone else to talk to about the personal and emotional side of having the disease. This, and Herxheimer's experience of knee replacement surgery, prompted them to come up with the idea of a patient experience website. A small group of people from various backgrounds were asked to join a Steering Group and after many meetings around McPherson's kitchen table, the idea came into being with the help of Lion New Media (part of Lion Television).

Methods 
The interviews featured on the websites are carried out through in-depth qualitative research into over 100 different illnesses and health conditions. Research is undertaken by many different research institutes. Oxford's Health Experiences Research Group research group is a key contributor. HERG has been rated as a highly performing primary care department in the country in research assessments.

Awards and accreditation 
DIPEx has won six "Commended"s and two "Highly Commended"s from the British Medical Association Patient Information Awards between 2004 and 2009. In 2009 they won "Third Sector Organisation of The Year" from the HealthInvestor Awards. DIPEx has been rated among the top ten online health resources by The Guardian Newspaper in 2004 and one of five health websites included in The Times newspaper's 'Top 50 websites you can't live without' in 2013. Both Youthhealthtalk and Healthtalkonline are approved by the Department of Health's Information Standard scheme. In May 2011, McPherson won the British Medical Journal's Health Communicator of the Year Award.

Supporters 
Patrons of the charity include Jon Snow, Hugh Grant, Lord Turnberg and previously Professor Sir David Weatherall. Well-known figures have supported the charity or contributed video introductions for the websites including Philip Pullman, Clive Anderson, Thom Yorke, Melvyn Bragg, Dawn French and Michael Palin.

References

Charities based in Oxfordshire
Health charities in the United Kingdom
Patient advocacy